Inédits 1970 (Unreleased 1970) is a compilation album by French rock singer Jacques Higelin, released in 1980. It is made from unreleased tracks from 1969 to 1971, recorded during the Jacques "Crabouif" Higelin sessions. Only the track "Nini" was released as a single back then. The instrumental parts were re-recorded in 1980 for this release, while the vocal track is the original one.

Track listing

 

1980 compilation albums
Jacques Higelin albums